Robert 'Chopper' Handley (born 8 January 1965) is a former Australian rules footballer who played for Hawthorn and St Kilda in the Victorian Football League (VFL) during the late 1980s.

Handley, who could play both as a wingman and on the ball, debuted with Hawthorn in 1985 and finished the year in their losing Grand Final team. He struggled to hold his place in a strong Hawthorn side the following two seasons and left the club to play for Central District Football Club in the South Australian National Football League (SANFL) in 1988. After one year he returned to Melbourne and signed on with St Kilda, with whom he could only manage four senior appearances. He finished his career back in South Australia at Central District, playing 135 games and topping their goal-kicking in 1992 with 40 goals.

References

Holmesby, Russell and Main, Jim (2007). The Encyclopedia of AFL Footballers. 7th ed. Melbourne: Bas Publishing.

1965 births
Living people
Australian rules footballers from Victoria (Australia)
Hawthorn Football Club players
St Kilda Football Club players
Central District Football Club players